Sea of Darkness is the 32nd installment in the Nancy Drew point-and-click adventure game series by Her Interactive. Players take on the first-person view of fictional amateur sleuth Nancy Drew and must solve the mystery through interrogation of suspects, solving puzzles, and discovering clues. There are two levels of gameplay, Amateur and Master sleuth modes, each offering a different difficulty level of puzzles and hints, however neither of these changes affect the actual plot of the game. It is the last game to feature Lani Minella as the voice of Nancy Drew, and is also the last game to use Her Interactive's proprietary game engine. The next game, Midnight in Salem, uses Unity.

Plot
The celebrated ship Heerlijkheid is usually the centerpiece of Skipbrot, Iceland's local festival. Now that its captain has disappeared, the renovated vessel has become an eerie distraction. Did Captain Magnus sail away with a legendary treasure, or was he carried off into the night? Take the helm as detective Nancy Drew and set a course for the Sea of Darkness!

Development

Characters
 Nancy Drew (Lani Minella) - Nancy is an 18-year-old amateur detective from the fictional town of River Heights in the United States. She is the only playable character in the game, which means the player must solve the mystery from her perspective.
 Magnus Kiljansson (Gene Thorkildsen) - Magnus is the captain working on the Heerlijkheid's restoration. He was supposed to safely steer the ship into the town’s port to kick off the Ancestors’ Festival, but when the ship arrived, it crashed into the harbor unmanned, with Magnus nowhere to be found. Is it possible Magnus located the treasure and abandoned ship? Or did something much more sinister cause his mysterious disappearance?
 Dagny Silva (Katherine Grant-Suttie) - As a renowned treasure hunter and the manager of the ship’s restoration, Dagny is furious with her business partner Magnus for disappearing. She suspects he went looking for the gold, found it, and took off, leaving her behind to clean up the mess. Dagny hires Nancy to track Magnus down and bring him to justice. But could Dagny know something she’s not letting on?
 Elísabet Grimursdóttir (Billie Wildrick) - A born and bred local, Elísabet helps Soren run the Ancestors’ Festival and controls access to the Heerlijkheid. Could her recent breakup with Magnus have inspired her to take revenge?
 Gunnar Tonnisson (Gene Thorkildsen) - A grumpy old sailor who yearns for the “olden days,” Gunnar is not shy about voicing his concerns regarding the way the festival is being managed. He doesn’t care about treasure hunting, and claims the town’s traditions and history are what really matter. Could Gunnar be harboring a hidden agenda to disrupt the festival?
 Soren Bergursson (Dane Stokinger) - Although Soren grew up ten miles from Skipbrot, he is considered an outsider and isn’t treated very well by his fellow residents. His vast education and knowledge of all things Icelandic aid in his running of the Culture Center and drive his fascination with local artifacts. He claims to be tired of hearing everyone talk about the treasure, but could he be secretly plotting to find the treasure himself?
 Ned Nickerson (Scott Carty) - Nancy's boyfriend, who is revealed to be celebrating his and Nancy's  anniversary. Ned is always available to provide Nancy with any support or help she might need.
 Alex Linh Trang (Kira Lauren) - Alex is a contact at the Reykjavik Harbormaster’s control tower. She and Magnus communicate by radio whenever he is on board the Heerlijkheid. Could she have any insights to Magnus’ disappearance the day the ship crashed?

Release
The game was released on May 19, 2015, though pre-orders began on April 14, 2015.

References 

 
   
 

2015 video games
Detective video games
Video games based on Nancy Drew
Video games developed in the United States
Point-and-click adventure games
Video games set in Iceland
Windows games
MacOS games
Her Interactive games
Video games with alternate endings
Single-player video games
North America-exclusive video games